Cackle Street can refer to any of three hamlets in East Sussex, England:

 Cackle Street, Brede near Brede - 50.93N 00.58E TQ8218
 Cackle Street, Brightling near Brightling - 50.94N 00.40E TQ6919
 Cackle Street, Wealden near Nutley - 51.01N 00.06E TQ4526